Scott Ambrose (born 23 January 1995) is a New Zealand former professional racing cyclist, who rode professionally between 2014 and 2017, entirely for , an all-diabetes team. He won the second stage of the 2015 Tour de Filipinas and finished first in the points classification.

Biography 

In Autumn 2013 he was diagnosed with Type I diabetes, after several disappointing sporting results over the course of the year. Following a consultation, his doctor told him  he was  underweight and he had all the symptoms of diabetes. He was taken to hospital after being diagnosed with glycaemia.

Ambrose turned professional in 2015 as part of the  team, whose members all have diabetes. In February 2015, he won the second stage of the Tour de Filipinas.

Major results

2012
 3rd Bruce Kent Memorial
 3rd Mauku Mountain Classic
 3rd Tour de Taranaki
 7th Time trial, Oceania Junior Road Championships
2013
 2nd The Hub – EMC2 Bikes Cycle Tour
2014
 1st Two Up Time Trial Aka Aka
 1st Stage 4 Tour de Taranaki
 3rd Taranaki Cycle Challenge
2015
 Tour de Filipinas
1st Points classification
1st Stage 2

References

External links

1995 births
Living people
New Zealand male cyclists
Sportspeople from Wellington City
21st-century New Zealand people